The 2022 Angus Council election took place on 5 May 2022, the same day as the 31 other Scottish local government elections. Each ward elected three or four councillors using the single transferable vote system, a form of proportional representation used since the 2007 election and according to the Local Governance (Scotland) Act 2004.

Background

Previous election
At the previous election in 2017, the Scottish National Party (SNP) remained the largest party - tied with the number of independents - despite losing 40 per cent of their seats. As a result, they lost control of the council to a coalition of independents, Conservatives and Liberal Democrats. The Conservatives had gained four seats to double their number of councillors while the Liberal Democrats also gained one seat to double their representation. Labour lost their only seat.

Composition
After the 2017 election, a couple of changes in the composition of the council happened. Most were changes to the political affiliation of councillors including the Arbroath West, Letham and Friockheim who resigned from the Liberal Democrats and sat as an Independent after he was found to have inappropriately touched several women.

Retiring councillors

Results

Ward summary

|- class="unsortable" align="centre"
!rowspan=2 align="left"|Ward
! % 
!Cllrs
! %
!Cllrs
! %
!Cllrs
! %
!Cllrs
! %
!Cllrs
! %
!Cllrs
!rowspan=2|TotalCllrs
|- class="unsortable" align="center"
!colspan=2 bgcolor=""|SNP
!colspan=2 bgcolor=""|Independent
!colspan=2 bgcolor=""|Conservative
!colspan=2 bgcolor=""|Lib Dem
!colspan=2 bgcolor=""|Lab
!colspan=2 bgcolor="white"|Others
|-
|align="left"|Kirriemuir and Dean
|bgcolor="" |41.97
|bgcolor="" |2
|9.44
|0
|38.41
|1
|5.1
|0
|6.7
|0
|7.8
|0
|3
|-
|align="left"|Brechin and Edzell
|bgcolor="" |34.10
|bgcolor="" |1
|20.44
|1
|32.32
|1
|5.95
|0
|7.20
|0
|colspan="2" 
|3
|-
|align="left"|Forfar and District
|bgcolor="" |38.37
|bgcolor="" |2
|28.90
|1
|21.36
|1
|1.66
|0
|5.50
|0
|4.21
|0
|4
|-
|align="left"|Monifieth and Sidlaw
|bgcolor="" |39.70
|bgcolor="" |2
|colspan="2" 
|30.75
|1
|11.18
|0
|13.46
|1
|4.92
|0
|4
|-
|align="left"|Carnoustie and District
|35.90
|1
|bgcolor=""|36.84
|bgcolor=""|2
|17.27
|0
|4.48
|0
|colspan="2" 
|5.50
|0
|3
|-
|align="left"|Arbroath West, Letham and Friockheim
|bgcolor="" |36.18
|bgcolor="" |2
|16.95
|1
|31.35
|1
|4.40
|0
|6.50
|0
|4.61
|0
|4
|-
|align="left"|Arbroath East and Lunan
|bgcolor="" |41.52
|bgcolor="" |1
|30.99
|1
|17.67
|1
|2.84
|0
|6.98
|0
|colspan="2" 
|3
|-
|align="left"|Montrose and District
|bgcolor="" |39.29
|bgcolor="" |2
|25.59
|1
|22.26
|1
|2.75
|0
|6.54
|0
|3.57
|0
|4
|- class="unsortable" class="sortbottom"
!align="left"|Total
!
!13
!
!7
!
!7
!
!0
!
!1
!
!0
!28
|}

Ward results

Kirriemuir and Dean
2012: 2 x SNP, 1 x Conservative
2017: 2 x Conservative, 1 x SNP
2022: 2 x SNP, 1 x Conservative
2017-2022 Change: 1 x SNP gain from Conservative

Brechin and Edzell
2012: 2 x SNP, 1 x Independent
2017: 1 x SNP, 1 x Independent, 1 x Conservative
2022: 1 x SNP, 1 x Independent, 1 x Conservative
2017-2022 Change: No Change

Forfar and District
2012: 2 x SNP, 2 x Independent
2017: 2 x Independent, 1 x SNP, 1 x Conservative
2022: 2 x SNP, 1 x Independent, 1 x Conservative
2017-2022 Change: 1 x SNP gain from Independent

Monifieth and Sidlaw
2012: 2 x SNP, 1 x Conservative, 1 x Labour
2017: 2 x SNP, 1 x Conservative, 1 x Liberal Democrat
2022: 2x SNP, 1 x Conservative, 1 x Labour
2017-2022 Change: 1 x Labour gain from Liberal Democrat

Carnoustie and District
2012: 2 x Independent, 1 x SNP
2017: 2 x Independent, 1 x SNP
2022: 2 x Independent, 1 x SNP
2017-2022 Change: No Change

Arbroath West, Letham and Friockheim
2012: 2 x SNP, 1 x Conservative, 1 x Independent
2017: 1 x SNP, 1 x Conservative, 1 x Independent, 1 x Liberal Democrat
2022: 2 x SNP, 1 x Conservative, 1 x Independent
2017-2022 Change: 1 x SNP gain from Liberal Democrat

Arbroath East and Lunan
2012: 2 x SNP, 1 x Independent, 1 x Conservative
2017: 1 x Conservative, 1 x Independent, 1 x SNP
2022: 1 x Conservative, 1 x Independent, 1 x SNP
2017-2022 Change: No Change

Montrose and District
2012: 2 x SNP, 1 x Independent, 1 x Liberal Democrat
2017: 2 x Independent, 1 x SNP, 1 x Conservative
2022: 2 x SNP, 1 Conservative, 1 x Independent
2017-2022 Change: 1 x SNP gain from Independent

Aftermath
The SNP formed a coalition with independents to run the council.

Notes

References

Angus Council elections
Angus